The Abbot of Clonmacnoise was the monastic head of Clonmacnoise. They also bore the title "Comarba of Saint Ciarán", "successor of Saint Ciarán". The following is a list of abbots:

List of abbots to 1539

Notes

References
Annette Kehnel, Clonmacnois the Church and Lands of St. Ciarán:Change and Continuity in an Irish Monastic Foundation (6th- to 16th Century), 1995, Transaction Publishers, Rutgers – State University, USA. .

 Clonmacnoise
Clonmacnoise
Religion in County Offaly